Komnino  is a village in the administrative district of Gmina Smołdzino, within Słupsk County, Pomeranian Voivodeship, in northern Poland.

The village has a population of 70.

References

Komnino